Major-General Richard Charles Keightley CB CStJ (born 2 July 1933) is a former British Army officer who became Commandant of the Royal Military Academy Sandhurst.

Military career
Born the son of General Sir Charles Keightley and educated at Marlborough College and the Royal Military Academy Sandhurst, Richard Keightley was commissioned into the 5th Royal Inniskilling Dragoon Guards in 1953. He took part in the Suez Crisis in 1956. He was appointed Commander Task Force E in 1978, General Officer Commanding Western District in 1982 and Commandant of the Royal Military Academy Sandhurst in 1983 before retiring in 1987.

He was Colonel of the 5th Royal Inniskilling Dragoon Guards from 1986 to 1991.

Family
In 1958 he married Caroline Rosemary Butler; they have three daughters.

References

 

|-

1933 births
Living people
British Army major generals
People educated at Marlborough College
Companions of the Order of the Bath
Commanders of the Order of St John
5th Royal Inniskilling Dragoon Guards officers
Graduates of the Royal Military Academy Sandhurst
Commandants of Sandhurst